is a former Japanese football player.

Playing career
Sakaguchi was born in Saitama Prefecture on March 5, 1975. After graduating from high school, he joined his local club Urawa Reds in 1993. On December 8, he debuted as midfielder against Verdy Kawasaki. However he could only play this match and retired end of 1994 season. In 2018, he entered the cryptocurrency industry by launching Ronaldinho Soccer Coin (now changed its name to World Soccer Coin) with Kenichiro Kira.

Club statistics

References

External links

1975 births
Living people
Association football people from Saitama Prefecture
Japanese footballers
J1 League players
Urawa Red Diamonds players
Association football midfielders